Pioneer Women's Memorial Garden may refer to:

 Pioneer Women's Memorial Garden (Adelaide)
 Pioneer Women's Memorial Garden (Melbourne)

See also
 Pioneer Women's Memorial (Sydney)
 Pioneer Women's Memorial (Perth)